Brandi Disterheft (born 1980) is a Canadian jazz bassist and composer.

Biography
Born in Vancouver, British Columbia, Canada, Disterheft grew up in the District of North Vancouver, British Columbia where she attended Handsworth Secondary School.  Upon graduation, she won scholarship to attend Humber College in Toronto, Ontario where she studied under Don Thompson.

Disterheft has also studied under Rufus Reid, Rodney Whitaker, and Oscar Peterson. Peterson notably said about Disterheft, "She has the same lope or rhythmic pulse as my bassist, Ray Brown. She is what we call serious."

Discography
 Debut (Superfran, 2007)
 Second Side (Justin Time, 2009)
 Pleased To Meet You - Hank Jones and Oliver Jones (pianist) (Justin Time, 2009)
 Gratitude (Justin Time, 2012)
 Blue Canvas (Justin Time, 2016)
 Surfboard (Justin Time, 2020)

Awards and recognition
2008: winner, Juno Award for Traditional Jazz Album of the Year, Debut

References

External links
Official web site

1980 births
Living people
Canadian jazz double-bassists
Juno Award for Traditional Jazz Album of the Year winners
21st-century Canadian double-bassists
Women double-bassists
People from North Vancouver
Humber College alumni
21st-century Canadian women musicians
Justin Time Records artists